Wenling railway station is a railway station on the Ningbo–Taizhou–Wenzhou railway and the Hangzhou–Taizhou high-speed railway located in Wenling, Taizhou, Zhejiang, China.

This station is also served by the Hangzhou–Taizhou high-speed railway, opened on 8 January 2022.

Metro station
Line S1 of the Taizhou Rail Transit opened on 28 December 2022.

History
The station closed from 11 October 2020 for construction of the Hangzhou–Shaoxing–Taizhou high-speed railway. It is expected to resume operation on 7 January 2021.

References

Railway stations in Zhejiang